"Ska vi älska, så ska vi älska till Buddy Holly" is a song written by Per Gessle and Mats "MP" Persson, recorded by Gyllene Tider and released as a single on 27 May 1980. It peaked at number eight on the Swedish singles chart.

Other recordings
In 1981, the song was also recorded by Kentons from Ljusdal.

Track listing
Ska vi älska, så ska vi älska till Buddy Holly - 3:44
(Dansar inte lika bra som) sjömän - 2.32

Charts

References

External links

1980 singles
Gyllene Tider songs
Songs written by Per Gessle
1980 songs
Parlophone singles
Songs written by Mats Persson (musician)
Songs about Buddy Holly